Jesús Ortega Benítez (born March 30, 1997, in Cuernavaca, Morelos) is a Mexican professional footballer who last played for Gavilanes de Matamoros.

See also
List of people from Morelos, Mexico

References

External links
 

1997 births
Living people
Association football midfielders
Club Atlético Zacatepec players
Gavilanes de Matamoros footballers
Ascenso MX players
Liga Premier de México players
Tercera División de México players
Footballers from Morelos
Sportspeople from Cuernavaca
Mexican footballers